U.S. Route 23 (US 23) is a part of the U.S. Highway System that runs from Jacksonville, Florida to Mackinaw City, Michigan.  In Virginia, the U.S. Highway runs  from the Tennessee state line near Weber City north to the Kentucky state line near Pound.  US 23, which is known as Orby Cantrell Highway for most of its course, is a four-lane divided highway that follows Corridor B of the Appalachian Development Highway System through Southwest Virginia.  The U.S. Highway serves as the main east–west highway of Scott County and the primary north–south highway of Wise County.  US 23 runs concurrently with US 58 from Weber City to Duffield and with US 58 Alternate between Big Stone Gap and the independent city of Norton.

Route description

US 23 enters Scott County at the Tennessee state line south of Weber City immediately north of the northern end of the US 23 freeway that becomes Interstate 26 in Kingsport.  At the state line, US 23 has a partial interchange with the northern end of SR 36 (Lynn Garden Drive) and SR 346 (Carters Valley Road).  US 23 passes through a gap between Cloud Ridge and Long Ridge at the state line, then crosses the North Fork Holston River on the John M. Johnson Memorial Bridge.  The U.S. Highway enters the town of Weber City as Main Street, which parallels Norfolk Southern Railway's Appalachia Division as a four-lane undivided highway.  At the north edge of the town, US 23 intersects US 58 and US 421 (Hilton Road); the three highways run concurrently with the railroad through Moccasin Gap, where Moccasin Creek passes through Clinch Mountain.  US 23, US 58, and US 421 enter the town of Gate City; US 23 Business, US 58 Business and US 421 Business pass through the center of town while the mainline of the U.S. Highways follows the flank of Clinch Mountain to the south of town.

US 23, US 58, and US 421 receive their three business routes at an interchange west of Gate City.  The U.S. Highways parallel the railroad and Little Moccasin Creek west between Clinch Mountain to the south and Moccasin Ridge to the north.  The highways curve north and parallel the Clinch River to Clinchport, where the road meets the southern end of SR 65 and begins to follow Stock Creek.  US 23, US 58, and US 421 pass by Glenita, where the railroad splits north to pass through the Natural Tunnel, the centerpiece of Natural Tunnel State Park.  After passing through the Devil's Racepath, US 58 and US 421 split from US 23 as Daniel Boone Trail just south of the town of Duffield.  US 23 passes through the town, where the highway parallels the Appalachia Division rail line and the North Fork Clinch River through a gap between Powell Mountain and Cliff Mountain.  The U.S. highway briefly enters Lee County while following the river between Powell Mountain and Walden Ridge to its source at Wildcat Summit at the Lee–Wise county line.

US 23 follows Wildcat Creek and becomes a freeway adjacent to Mountain Empire Community College south of Big Stone Gap.  The U.S. Highway has a partial cloverleaf interchange with US 23 Business and US 58 Alternate; the latter highway joins US 23 in a concurrency.  The two highways have a diamond interchange with SR 610 (Powell Valley Road) before following the southern flank of Little Stone Mountain to Little Stone Gap, where the freeway enters the city of Norton.  US 23 and US 58 Alternate have a partial cloverleaf interchange with Kentucky Avenue south of downtown Norton.  The highways curve north over a rail line and SR 74 before reaching a partial cloverleaf interchange where US 58 Alternate splits east on Norton Coeburn Road, which heads west toward downtown Norton as SR 283.  US 23 leaves the city of Norton and receives the other end of US 23 Business (Esserville Road) at Esserville.  A short distance to the north, US 23 enters the town of Wise, where another US 23 Business splits northeast as Norton Road to serve the county seat of Wise County.  The U.S. Highway receives the north end of its business route (Main Street) before the highway crosses the Tennessee Valley Divide at Indian Mountain.  US 23 descends along Indian Creek to the southern end of its fourth business route, which heads into the town of Pound as Indian Creek Road.  The U.S. Highway briefly enters the town limits while receiving the north end of the business route, Main Street.  North of Pound, US 23 passes through Horse Gap and makes a curve to the west before entering Kentucky at Pound Gap in Pine Mountain.  The U.S. Highway meets US 119 on the north side of the mountain; the two highways run concurrently north toward Pikeville.

Much of US 23 in Virginia is part of Crooked Road, Virginia and The Crooked Road: Virginia's Heritage Music Trail.

History
The road from Moccasin Gap (now Weber City) south to Tennessee towards Kingsport was added to the state highway system in 1923.  As a spur of SR 10 (now US 58), it was assigned the State Route 102 designation, and was renumbered State Route 108 in the 1928 renumbering.

Major intersections

Business routes
In Virginia, US 23 has four business routes.  From South to North, its first business route serves downtown Gate City.  The second begins in Big Stone Gap and runs north to Appalachia, then turns east to Norton.  Its third business route runs along portions of Norton Road and West Main Street in Wise.  The fourth and northernmost route is located in Pound.

References

External links

Virginia Highways Project: US 23

23
U.S. Route 023
U.S. Route 023
U.S. Route 023
U.S. Route 023
Wise, Virginia